Kathleen Stewart (born 1958 Sydney) is an Australian writer. She has written eight novels, and published two books of poetry. Her novel Spilt Milk was shortlisted for the NSW Premier's Award, and her memoir The After Life was shortlisted for the Nita Kibble Literary Award. Her novel Men of Bad Character was published by the University of Queensland Press in June, 2010.

Personal life 
She currently lives in the Blue Mountains.

Publications 
 Men of Bad Character (2010) 
 The After Life: A memoir (2008) 
 The Black Butterfly (2001) 
 The Red Room (1999) 
 The White Star (1997) 
 Nightflowers (1996) 
 Spilt Milk (1995) 
 Snow (1994) 
 Louis: A Normal Novel (1993) 
 The Victim Train (1992)

Awards and nominations

 2009 - Nita Kibble Literary Award for The After Life: A memoir
 1995 - NSW Premier's Award for Spilt Milk
 1994 - Victorian Premier's Literary Award for Snow

References

1958 births
Living people
Australian women novelists
Writers from Sydney